Hrishikesh Pandey is an Indian television actor. He appeared in Hamari Betiyoon Ka Vivaah as Shakti, and plays the role of Inspector Sachin in C.I.D. Also seen in Jag Janani Maa Vaishno Devi - Kahani Mata Rani Ki as Maharaj Ratnakar Sagar.

Career
Pandey's career as an actor began in 2001 with the role of Vishal Gill in the serial Kohi Apna Sa broadcast by Zee TV. His subsequent roles include Shakti in Hamari Betiyoon Ka Vivaah, Inspector Sachin in C.I.D., Rocky in Aahat and recently as Senapati Ripudaman Singh in Porus. He is also seen in Dhai Akshar Prem Ke as Sameer 'Sam', Nisha's (Sonali Bendre) husband.

Filmography

Films

Television

Personal life
He married Trisha Dubash in 2004 and they got divorced in 2021

References

External links

Living people
Indian male television actors
1964 births
Male actors in Hindi television
21st-century Indian male actors